Margarete of Saxony (born 4 August 1469 in Meissen – died: 7 December 1528 in Weimar) was a Saxon princess of the Ernestine line of the house Wettin by birth and by marriage a Duchess of Brunswick-Lüneburg.

Life 
Margarete was a daughter of the Elector Ernest of Saxony (1441–1486) from his marriage to Elizabeth (1443–1484), a daughter of the Duke Albert III of Bavaria-Munich.  Her brothers Frederick the Wise and John the Steadfast were Electors of Saxony; her sister Christina was Queen of Denmark.

Margarete married on 27 February 1487 in Celle with Duke Henry I of Brunswick-Lüneburg (1468–1532).  Henry had already been sent to the Saxon court as a 12-year-old.  Marriage negotiations presumably began in 1469, as Henry's father, Otto V had formed an alliance with Margarete's uncle William.  The Saxon side had delayed the marriage until the expansion of the Celle Castle was completed, as the district and castle of Celle had been promised to Margarete as her wittum.

Margarete died in 1528 and was buried in the Church of St. Peter and Paul in Weimar.

Issue 
 Anna (born: 1492; died young)
 Elisabeth (1494–1572)
 married in 1518 Duke Charles II of Guelders (1467–1538)
 Otto I (1495–1549), Duke of Brunswick-Lüneburg
 married in 1525 Meta of Campe (died: 1580)
 Ernest I the Confessor (1497–1546), Duke of Brunswick-Lüneburg
 married in 1528 Princess Sophia of Mecklenburg (1508–1541)
 Apollonia (1499–1571), nun
 Anna (1502–1568)
 married in 1525 Duke Barnim IX of Pomerania (1501–1573)
 Francis (1508–1549), Duke of Brunswick-Gifhorn
 married in 1547 princess Clara of Saxe-Lauenburg (1518–1576)

References 
 Martina Schattkowsky: Witwenschaft in der frühen Neuzeit, Universitätsverlag Leipzig, 2003, p. 171 ff (Online)
 Horst Masuch: Das Schloss in Celle, A. Lax, 1983
 Ingetraut Ludolphy: Friedrich der Weise: Kurfürst von Sachsen 1463- 1525, Vandenhoeck und Rupprecht, Göttingen, 1984

House of Wettin
1469 births
1528 deaths
Duchesses of Brunswick-Lüneburg
15th-century German people
16th-century German people
15th-century German women
Middle House of Lüneburg
Daughters of monarchs